Lagu Kenangan ('Song of Memories') is a 1953 Indonesian film directed by  and produced by Djamaluddin Malik for the Persari Film Corporation. Starring Titien Sumarni and A. N. Alcaff, it follows the domestic troubles of a composer and his wife.

Plot
The composer Supardi lives with his wife, Surjati, and their two children Janti and Janto. The couple often fight, owing to Supardi's late hours, as he does his best work at night when the children are sleeping. Things escalate to the point that Surjati takes Janti and leaves. This separation nearly ends in divorce, but eventually with the support of their parents, Surjati and Supardi are able to reconcile.

Production
Lagu Kenangan was produced for Persari Film Corporation by Djamaluddin Malik. The film was one in a long line of commercially oriented ventures which had been produced by the company starting with Sedap Malam in 1950.

The film starred Titien Sumarni and AN Alcaff. They were supported by Mien Sondakh, M. Budhrasa, Sjamsu, Ramlan, and Djauhari Effendi.

Release
Lagu Kenangan passed the censorship bureau in 1953, and was rated for viewers aged 13 and up. Screenings are reported as early as 14 August, at the Rivoli Theatre in Jakarta. The film had reached Malang, East Java, by 7 November 1953. For its run there at the Atrium Theater, it was advertised as a "charming, sad, funny and replete with melodious songs" ("menawan hati, sedih, lutju, dan diringi dengan njanjian2 jang merdu"). Lagu Kenangan was screened as late as August 1955.

References

Works cited

External links

1953 films
Indonesian-language films
Indonesian black-and-white films